Zahra is a settlement of 

Jafara in Libya.

References 

Sahara
Baladiyat of Libya